Nerz is a surname of German origin. It means "mink" in English.  Notable persons with that surname include:

 Dominik Nerz (born 1989), German road cyclist
 Joachim Nerz (born 1964), German botanist
 Louis Nerz (1866–1938), Austrian screenwriter and actor
 Otto Nerz (1892–1949), German football manager
 Sebastian Nerz (born 1983), German bioinformatician and politician (Pirates)